Margaret of Denmark may refer to:

 Margaret Fredkulla (1080s–1130), wife of king Niels of Denmark
 Margarethe of Bohemia (1186–1212), aka Queen Dagmar, first wife of Valdemar II of Denmark
 Margaret Sambiria (1230–1282) of Pomerelia, wife of king Christopher I of Denmark
 Margaret I of Scandinavia (1353–1412), wife of Haakon VI of Norway, daughter of Valdemar IV of Denmark, mother of Olaf II of Denmark, also ruled Scandinavia as de facto queen regnant
 Margaret of Denmark, Queen of Scotland (1456–1486), queen-consort of James III of Scotland
 Princess Margaret of Denmark (1895–1992), wife of Prince René of Bourbon-Parma, daughter of Prince Valdemar of Denmark and mother of Queen Anne of Romania
 Princess Margaretha of Sweden (1899–1977), Princess of Denmark through her marriage to Prince Axel
 Margrethe II of Denmark (born 1940), the present head of state of Denmark